Zahed Ali is a Bangladesh Nationalist Party politician and the former Member of Parliament of Sherpur-2.

Career
Ali was elected to parliament from Sherpur-2 as a Bangladesh Nationalist Party candidate in 2001. He served as the whip in the parliament. In 2010, he served as the central publication secretary of the Bangladesh Nationalist Party.

References

Living people
People from Sherpur District
Bangladesh Nationalist Party politicians
6th Jatiya Sangsad members
8th Jatiya Sangsad members
Year of birth missing (living people)